Walang Iwanan, Peksman is a 2002 Philippine romantic action comedy film produced and directed by Toto Natividad. The film stars Jinggoy Estrada and Judy Ann Santos.

Cast
 Jinggoy Estrada as Carding
 Judy Ann Santos as Helen
 Bayani Agbayani as Bodong
 Ace Espinosa as Jo Del Gado
 Pyar Mirasol as Jinky
 Robert Arevalo as Helen's Father
 Travador Ramos as Capt. Fidel Moreno
 Izza Ignacio as Julie
 Romy Diaz as Oscar
 Minnie Aguilar as Betty
 Rommel Montano as Ariel
 Val Iglesias as Tata Simon
 Bryan Homecillo as Bong
 Kuya Cesar as Priest
 Maning Bato as Patient
 Jimmy Regino as himself
 Vingo Regino as himself
 Torling Pader as Karyong Kilatis
 Boy Gomez as Asiong Akyat
 Philip Supnet as Michael
 Jaime Cuales as Pepeng Pingas
 Ate Guy as Binong Bading
 Tacio Tangkad as Jordan
 Josie Tagle as Landlady
 Tessie Villarama as Helen's Mother
 Banjo Romero as Jo's Henchman
 Boy Roque as Ariel's Henchman
 Malou Crisologo as Denver's Nanny
 Rene Matias as Police Victim
 Rey Solo as Taxi Driver Victim
 Nonong Talbo as Priest
 Lucy Quinto as Raquedan's Wife
 Vic Felipe as Warden
 Manuel Montemayor as Police Asset
 Ernie Forte as Berting's Asset

Production
Initially produced by Millenium Cinema, the film was supposed to be part of the 2000 Metro Manila Film Festival, but production was put on hold, with Jinggoy Estrada being part of the committee. Ping Lacson: Supercop, also directed by Toto Natividad, took over its place. When Millenium closed shop at the start of 2001, Natividad took over the film's production under the Jolo Films banner. It was later on supposed to be part of the 2001 Metro Manila Film Festival, but was not able to make it to the cut-off. Its playdate was set to early January 2002.

References

External links

2002 films
2002 action comedy films
2000s romantic action films
Filipino-language films
Philippine action comedy films
Films directed by Toto Natividad